The Tower of Tajo (Spanish: Torre del Tajo) is a tower located in Barbate, Spain. It was declared Bien de Interés Cultural in 1985.

References 

Bien de Interés Cultural landmarks in the Province of Cádiz
Towers in Spain